Johann Eyfells (21 June 1923 – 3 December 2019) was an Icelandic artist.

Originally trained as an architect, Johann worked as a Professor of Art at the University of Central Florida in Orlando from 1969 until his retirement from university teaching in 1999.

The son of the noted Icelandic landscape painter Eyjolfur J. Eyfells (1886–1979) Johann Eyfells had been showing his work at international venues since the 1960s.

The source of his inspiration and the love of his life was his late wife, fellow artist and painter Kristin Halldorsdottir, (1917–2002) a former Icelandic model and dress designer, who he met in California and married in 1949. Together they attended the University of Florida in Gainesville where Johann earned his Bachelor of Architecture degree in 1953 and where he took a Master of Fine Art degree in sculpture in 1964.

Eyfells began creating his abstract sculptures in the early 1960s based on experiments in chemistry and physics, utilizing the interaction of the various inherent and transformative properties of metals, especially aluminum, iron and copper. His art often conceptual in approach. His use of materials varied between metal, wood, paper, cloth, and latex rubber.

Eyfells' creative drive was to document the interaction between time, space and gravity. His work is based on the concepts of receptualism, a theory he developed to explain the essence of his art. He received much recognition throughout his career, including an invitation from the government of Iceland to represent his homeland at the 45th Venice Biennale. His work has been featured in the United Nations' exhibition, World Artists at the Millennium and the nine-museum traveling exhibition What Nature Provides.

In 2016 a documentary/biography on the then 92-year-old artist was released; "A Force in Nature: Johann Eyfells".

References 

1923 births
Icelandic artists
Icelandic sculptors
2019 deaths
Icelandic expatriates in the United States